Eviota melasma, commonly called headspot eviota or melasma pygmy goby among various other vernacular names, is a species of marine fish in the family Gobiidae.

The headspot eviota has been recorded only from Australia, records elsewhere are thought to be misidentifications. It is found on offshore reefs and coastal reefs, just below the tidal zone.

The headspot eviota is a small sized fish, it can grow up to a size of  length. It is a semi-transparent pygmygoby marked with irregular rufous internal bars along the length of its body, there is a black spot above the opening of the gills and there are irregular reddish blotches on its nape and it has three reddish blotches which are separated by whitish barring on the belly. There is also a thin white stripe at the base of the pectoral fin.

References

External links
 

Taxa named by Ernest A. Lachner
Taxa named by Susan J. Karnella
Fish described in 1980
melasma